Oukan is a vegan, Japanese fine dining restaurant in Berlin. It was founded by Tran Mai Huy Thong, a Vietnamese-German with a background in fashion design. The menu was developed with culinary advice from Buddhist monastics, based on the religious diet shōjin ryōri.

Reception 
Berliner Zeitung wrote in December 2021 that the food tasted "from something that takes getting used to to absolutely fantastic".

References 

Restaurants in Germany